Wahkohtowin is a Cree word which denotes the interconnected nature of relationships, communities, and natural systems. Its literal meaning is "kinship", but it is often used to refer to Cree law, or Cree codes of conduct.

Etymology 
In the Cree language, nêhiyaw wiyasowêwina literally translates to "Cree laws", but law is almost invariably referred to as wahkohtowin, which means "kinship", in reference to an individual's relationship with, and responsibilities within, the systems of which the individual is a part. As such, "wahkohtowin" is an imperfect translation of "law", because law in the pre-colonial Cree context does not refer solely to positivistic or formalistic rules. Rather, wahkohtowin is a set of obligations which flows from one's role within his or her community.

Origins 
Understandings about wahkohtowin may have sacred origins, may come from positivistic rules, or may come from observations about the natural environment. Knowledge from these sources is then processed through deliberation, ceremony, and storytelling. Cree law lives on primarily through stories, which are among the most important references for Indigenous law.

Features 
The most recurrent theme within wahkohtowin is the circle. Wahkohtowin connotes interconnectedness, so circles are used as symbols to represent the way in which every element of a system is part of the whole. This reaffirms unity under the Creator and within the community, and represents the continuum of life. Wahkohtowin sometimes physically takes this form; for example, a community may gather in circles for prayer, discussion, and healing.

Cree law uses different circles as a visual way to conceptualize different legal principles; there are usually four elements or stages comprising a given circle. For example, the most foundational circle-metaphor describes the four kinds of human beings; when one understands one's identity in this circle, then one accepts the responsibilities which accompany that identity. Envisioned as a series of concentric circles, children (the most treasured and precious) are placed at the centre. Old ones are next; they are the keepers and teachers of knowledge and represent the past. Women, the nurturers and protectors, are third, and men, who are responsible for safety, constitute the outermost circle.

Another important circle metaphor in the Cree worldview represents one's personal identity. The innermost level represents the individual, followed by the family, the community, and the nation, respectively. In the Cree worldview, identity is inseparable from land, home, community, or family; these things together constitute a healthy wahkohtowin.

Further reading
The website of the Truth and Reconciliation Commission of Canada
Friedland, Hadley (2009). The Wetiko (Windigo) Legal Principles: Responding to Harmful People in Aree, Anishinabek and Saulteaux Societies—Past, Present and Future Uses, With a Focus on Contemporary Violence and Child Victimization Concerns (LLM Thesis). University of Alberta Faculty of Law [unpublished].

References

Canadian Aboriginal and indigenous law
Legal doctrines and principles
Cree
Customary legal systems
Kinship and descent

Cree
Cultural conventions
Cree culture